This is a list of Iranian football transfers for the 2017 summer transfer window. Transfers of Iran Pro League and Azadegan League are listed. Transfer window was opened on June 15, 2017, and will be open until September 6, 2017, for players who played in Iranian clubs.

The Iranian Football Clubs who participate in 2017–18 Iranian football different levels are allowed to have up to maximum 57 players in their player lists, which will be categorized in the following groups:

 Up to maximum 18 adult (without any age limit) players
 Up to maximum 9 under-23 players (i.e. the player whose birth is after 1 January 1995).
 Up to maximum 15 under-21 players (i.e. the player whose birth is after 1 January 1997).
 Up to maximum 15 under-19 players (i.e. the player whose birth is after 1 January 1999).

Iran Pro League

Rules and regulations 
According to Iran Football Federation rules for 2017–18 Iran Pro League, each Football Club is allowed to take up to maximum 6 new Iranian player from the other clubs who already played in the 2016–17 Iran Pro League season. In addition to these six new players, each club is allowed to take up to maximum 4 non-Iranian new players (at least one of them should be Asian) and up to 3 players from Free agent (who did not play in 2017–18 Iran Pro League season or doesn't list in any 2017–18 League after season's start) during the season. In addition to these players, the clubs are also able to take some new under-23 and under-21 years old players, if they have some free place in these categories in their player lists. Under-23 players should sign in transfer window but under-21 can be signed during the first mid-season.

Esteghlal 
Head coach:  Alireza Mansourian
Remaining Pro League quota: 2

In:

Out:

Esteghlal Khuzestan 
Head coach:  Abdollah Veisi
Remaining Pro League quota: 1

In:

Out:

Foolad 
Head coach:  Sirous Pourmousavi
Remaining Pro League quota: 1

In:

Out:

Gostaresh Foulad 
Head coach:  Luka Bonačić
Remaining Pro League quota: 1

In:

Out:

Naft Tehran 
Head coach:  Hamid Derakhshan
Remaining Pro League quota: 4

In:

Out:

Padideh 
Head coach:  Mohammad Reza Mohajeri
Remaining Pro League quota: 0

In:

Out:

Pars Jonoubi Jam 
Head coach:  Mehdi Tartar
Remaining Pro League quota: 1No.PL

In:

Out:

Paykan 
Head coach:  Majid Jalali
Remaining Pro League quota: 3

In:

Out:

Persepolis 
Head coach:  Branko Ivanković
Remaining Pro League quota: 3

In:

Out:

Saipa 
Head coach:  Ali Daei
Remaining Pro League quota: 1

In:

Out:

Sanat Naft 
Head coach:  Faraz Kamalvand
Remaining Pro League quota: 0

In:

Out:

Sepahan 
Head coach:  Zlatko Kranjčar
Remaining Pro League quota: 1

In:

Out:

Sepidrood 
Head coach:  Ali Nazarmohammadi
Remaining Pro League quota: 1No.PL

In:

Out:

Siah Jamegan 
Head coach:  Akbar Misaghian
Remaining Pro League quota: 4

In:

Out:

Tractor 
Head coach:  Yahya Golmohammadi 
Remaining Pro League quota: 6

In:

Out:

Zob Ahan 
Head coach:  Amir Ghalenoei
Remaining Pro League quota: 3

In:

Out:

Notes
PL Pro League quota.
No.PL Pars Jonoubi Jam and Sepidrood are allowed to get 7 Pro League quota players.

See also
 List of Iranian football transfers winter 2015–16
 List of Iranian football transfers summer 2016
 List of Iranian football transfers winter 2016–17
 List of Iranian football transfers summer 2017
 List of Iranian football transfers winter 2017–18

Notes and references

Football transfers summer 2017
2017
Transfers